LeVar Woods (born March 15, 1978) is the special teams coach at the University of Iowa, where he played linebacker during his college career. As an professional football player, he was originally signed by the Arizona Cardinals as an undrafted free agent in 2001, played for a season and a half with the Detroit Lions (2005–2006), and finished his career with the Tennessee Titans (2006–2007).

High school career 
Woods attended West Lyon High School in Larchwood, Iowa and was a letterman in football, basketball, and track.  He graduated from West Lyon High School in 1996. Woods was the Iowa 2A player of the year as a senior.

College career
Woods attended the University of Iowa, and was a letterman in football. Playing for both Hayden Fry and Kirk Ferentz, he was a two-year starter as an outside linebacker. He finished his spectacular college career with four sacks and 165 tackles. In 1999, he returned a blocked field goal for a touchdown against Northern Illinois to help clinch Ferentz's first Iowa victory. As a senior, he was an All-Big Ten Conference second-team selection, and was given the Hayden Fry Extra Heartbeat Award.

NFL career 
Woods played in the NFL from 2001 to 2007. After going undrafted in the 2001 NFL Draft, he signed for the Arizona Cardinals, where he played four seasons. He later played for the Detroit Lions and Tennessee Titans. Mostly a reserve linebacker in the NFL, Woods excelled on special teams. In 88 career games, Woods totaled 168 tackles, 2.5 quarterback sacks, four fumble recoveries and one forced fumble.

During his NFL career, Woods was named a finalist for both the Byron “Whizzer” White and Walter Payton Man of the Year awards, recognizing his contributions to charity.

Coaching career

Early Iowa coaching career (2008–2017) 
After retiring from playing, Woods and his family relocated to Iowa City, though Woods wasn't sure if coaching was in his future. He joined the Iowa football staff as a low-paid administrative assistant in 2008, a role he held for four seasons. As an administrative assistant, Woods compiled statistics, helped with recruiting, social media, and the Iowa football website. At the end of the 2010 season, Iowa defensive coordinator Norm Parker had a foot amputated due to diabetes complications, and Woods became an interim assistant coach in Parker’s absence. After the 2011 regular season, Iowa defensive line coach Rick Kaczenski left to join the Nebraska program, and Woods filled in as the defensive line coach for the 2011 Insight Bowl against Oklahoma.

In 2012, Woods was promoted to a full-time on-field assistant coach, coaching outside linebackers and assisting with special teams. Woods and middle linebackers coach Jim Reid developed an excellent linebacking trio in Christian Kirksey, Anthony Hitchens, and James Morris, each earning All-Big Ten recognition. Reid and Woods were named national Linebacker Coaches of the Year by FootballScoop following the 2013 season.

In 2015, Woods switched to tight ends coach, continuing to assist with special teams. Coaching tight ends until 2017, Woods developed two and three-star prospects into starting tight ends. These players included Henry Krieger-Coble, Jake Duzey, and future All-Pro George Kittle. Woods also coached the early careers of Noah Fant and T.J. Hockensen, both future first round picks.

Iowa Special Teams coordinator (2018–present) 
In 2017, Woods became special teams coordinator in addition to coaching tight ends. In 2018, Woods became Iowa's full-time special teams coordinator without coaching another position. Woods recruits the St. Louis and Phoenix metros for the Hawkeyes, and in 2017 landed one of Iowa's highest-ranked recruits ever in defensive end A.J. Epenesa.

Under Woods' guidance, Hawkeye special teams were consistently ranked among national leaders in punt and kick return and return defense. Woods developed several All-Big Ten and All-American specialists and returners. Return man and wide receiver Ihmir Smith-Marsette won the 2018 Rodgers-Dwight Big Ten Return Specialist of the Year, after finishing second nationally in average return yards. In 2019, placekicker Keith Duncan earned consensus first-team All-America honors, was named the Bakken-Andersen Kicker of the Year in the Big Ten and was one of three finalists for the Lou Groza Award. Duncan was replaced after graduation by Caleb Shudak, who was first-team All-Big Ten in 2020. In 2020, freshman punter Tory Taylor was named the Eddleman–Fields Punter of the Year in the Big Ten and finished as a semifinalist for the Ray Guy Award. In 2021, former walk-on transfer Charlie Jones won the Rodgers-Dwight Big Ten Return Specialist of the Year for his kick and punt return efforts.

The Hawkeye special teams scored on several trick plays designed by Woods, including a "swinging gate" direct snap from long snapper Jackson Subbert to tight end T.J. Hockenson against Minnesota, and an over-the-shoulder catch by defensive lineman Sam Brincks from a pass by punter Colten Rastetter against Penn State. In Iowa's 2017 55–24 upset win over #3 Ohio State, an elaborate "polecat" fake field goal ended with Rastetter completing a pass to long snapper Tyler Kluver, who stumbled at the goal line but set up a Hawkeye touchdown.

References

External links
 NFL profile
 Iowa Hawkeyes profile

1978 births
Living people
Sportspeople from Cleveland
American football linebackers
Iowa Hawkeyes football players
Arizona Cardinals players
Detroit Lions players
Tennessee Titans players
Iowa Hawkeyes football coaches
Educators from Ohio
Players of American football from Cleveland